Dave Caruso (born June 18, 1982) is an American former professional ice hockey goaltender. Since September 2012 he has served as the goaltending coach for the Albany Devils in the American Hockey League (AHL).

Career statistics

Regular season

Awards and honours

References

External links

1982 births
Living people
Albany Devils players
American men's ice hockey goaltenders
Charlotte Checkers (1993–2010) players
Chicago Wolves players
Gwinnett Gladiators players
Ice hockey players from New York (state)
Lowell Devils players
Ohio State Buckeyes men's ice hockey players
Trenton Devils players